Kenny Smith (born September 8, 1977, in Meridian, Mississippi) is a former American football defensive lineman. He was drafted by the New Orleans Saints in the third round of the 2001 NFL Draft. He played college football at Alabama.

Smith has also been a member of the Oakland Raiders, Tampa Bay Buccaneers, New England Patriots, and Kansas City Chiefs.

Professional career

New Orleans Saints
Smith was drafted in the third round of the 2001 NFL Draft by the New Orleans Saints. He appeared in six games as a rookie in 2001, recording eight tackles. He played in nine games in 2002, starting one while posting 19 tackles and 3.5 sacks on the season. He had a career-high 42 tackles in 15 games (nine starts) in 2003, while recording one sack. He spent 2004 on injured reserve.

Oakland Raiders
Smith signed with the Oakland Raiders as an unrestricted free agent on March 31, 2005, but was placed on injured reserve and was released on November 2, 2005.

Tampa Bay Buccaneers
After spending 2006 out of football, Smith signed with the Tampa Bay Buccaneers on March 7, 2007. The team released him on April 30, 2007.

New England Patriots
Smith signed with the Patriots on June 8, 2007. He was released on August 22, 2007, and re-signed with the Patriots on April 22, 2008. Before the 2008 season he was placed on injured reserve and missed the entire season. He was released on June 4, 2009.

Kansas City Chiefs
Smith was signed by the Chiefs on October 21, 2009, and waived on December 8, 2009.

Personal
Smith's son, J'Mar, played quarterback at Louisiana Tech and was named Conference USA's 2019 Football Offensive Player of the Year.  On May 5, 2020, J'Mar signed as an undrafted free agent with the New England Patriots.

References

External links
New England Patriots bio

1977 births
Living people
Players of American football from Mississippi
Sportspeople from Meridian, Mississippi
American football defensive tackles
American football defensive ends
Alabama Crimson Tide football players
New Orleans Saints players
Oakland Raiders players
Tampa Bay Buccaneers players
New England Patriots players
Kansas City Chiefs players